Harold Bowen may refer to:
 Harold G. Bowen Sr. (1883–1965), United States Navy admiral
 Harold L. Bowen (1886–1967), bishop of the Episcopal Diocese of Colorado